Norton is a commuter town in the province of Mashonaland West, Zimbabwe near Harare. It is located about 40 km west of Harare on the main road and railway line connecting Harare and Bulawayo.

Demographics

According to the 1982 Population Census, the town had a population of 12,360. This 
rose to 20,405 in the 1992 census  44,054 in the 2002 census, and 67,591 in the 2012 census.

History
The settlement began in 1914 when a railway siding was built. The town was named after the Norton family who were farming in the area since the 1890s and were killed in the First Chimurenga in 1896. The town grew as an administrative and commercial hub in a rich agricultural area. It later developed into a key industrial centre due to its proximity to water and power supplies, with a main intake point from the Lake Kariba hydroelectric dam to the national grid located nearby. The construction of the nearby Lake Chivero dam provided a further boost to development.

Economy
The farm lands surrounding the town produce a range of crops including tobacco, maize and wheat, and cattle rearing for the beef and dairy industries is also an important element of the local economy. From the 1960s onward, a large pulp and paper mill, a brewery and several factories were established in the town. However, these were badly hit by the economic crisis of the late 2000s.

See also
 Knowledge Musona, Zimbabwean footballer, born in Norton in 1990
 Washington Arubi, Zimbabwean footballer, born in Norton in 1985
 List of cities and towns in Zimbabwe

References

External links
 Norton Constituency Profile (2011)

 
Populated places in Mashonaland West Province
1914 establishments in Southern Rhodesia